In the electricity sector in the United Kingdom, the National Grid is the high-voltage electric power transmission network serving Great Britain, connecting power stations and major substations and ensuring that electricity generated anywhere on it can be used to satisfy demand elsewhere. The network covers the great majority of Great Britain and several of the surrounding islands. It does not cover Northern Ireland, which is part of a single electricity market with the Republic of Ireland.

The GB grid is connected as a wide area synchronous grid nominally running at 50 hertz. There are also undersea interconnections to other grids in the Isle of Man, Northern Ireland, the Republic of Ireland, France, Belgium, the Netherlands and Norway.

On the breakup of the Central Electricity Generating Board in 1990, the ownership and operation of the National Grid in England and Wales passed to National Grid Company plc, later to become National Grid Transco, and now National Grid plc. In Scotland the grid was already split into two separate entities, one for southern and central Scotland and the other for northern Scotland, with interconnectors. The first is owned and maintained by SP Energy Networks, a subsidiary of Scottish Power, and the other by SSE. However, National Grid plc continues to be the transmission system operator for the whole GB grid.

History

At the end of the 19th century, Nikola Tesla established the principles of three-phase high-voltage electric power distribution while he was working for Westinghouse in the United States. The first use of this system in the United Kingdom was by Charles Merz, of the Merz & McLellan consulting partnership, at his Neptune Bank Power Station near Newcastle upon Tyne. This opened in 1901, and by 1912 had developed into the largest integrated power system in Europe. The rest of the country, however, continued to use a patchwork of small supply networks.

In 1925, the British government asked Lord Weir, a Glaswegian industrialist, to solve the problem of Britain's inefficient and fragmented electricity supply industry. Weir consulted Merz, and the result was the Electricity (Supply) Act 1926, which recommended that a "national gridiron" supply system be created. The 1926 Act created the Central Electricity Board, which set up the UK's first synchronised, nationwide AC grid, running at 132 kV, 50 Hz.

The first "grid tower" was erected near Edinburgh on 14 July 1928, and work was completed in September 1933, ahead of schedule and on budget. It began operating in 1933 as a series of regional grids with auxiliary interconnections for emergency use. Following the unauthorised but successful short term parallelling of all regional grids by the night-time engineers on 29 October 1937, by 1938 the grid was operating as a national system. The growth by then in the number of electricity users was the fastest in the world, rising from three quarters of a million in 1920 to nine million in 1938. The grid proved its worth during the Blitz, when South Wales provided power to replace lost output from Battersea and Fulham power stations. The grid was nationalised by the Electricity Act 1947, which also created the British Electricity Authority. In 1949, the British Electricity Authority decided to upgrade the grid by adding 275 kV links.

At its inception in 1950, the 275 kV Transmission System was designed to form part of a national supply system with an anticipated total demand of 30,000 MW by 1970. The predicted demand was already exceeded by 1960. This rapid growth led the Central Electricity Generating Board (created in 1958) to carry out a study in 1960 of future transmission needs.

Considered in the study, together with the increased demand, was the effect on the transmission system of the rapid advances in generator design resulting in projected power stations of 2,000–3,000 MW installed capacity. These new stations were mostly to be sited where advantage could be taken of a surplus of cheap low-grade fuel and adequate supplies of cooling water, but these sites did not coincide with the load centres. West Burton's 4 × 500 MW machines, in the Nottinghamshire coalfield near the River Trent, is an example. These developments shifted the emphasis on the transmission system from interconnection to bulk power transfers from the generation areas to the load centres, such as the anticipated transfer in 1970 of some 6,000 MW from the Midlands to the home counties.

Continued reinforcement and extension of the 275 kV systems was examined as a possible solution. However, in addition to the technical problem of high fault levels, many more lines would have been required to obtain the estimated transfers at 275 kV. As this was not consistent with the Central Electricity Generating Board's policy of preservation of amenities, a better solution was sought. Consideration was given to 400 kV and 500 kV schemes: both gave a sufficient margin for future expansion. The decision in favour of a 400 kV system was made for two main reasons. Firstly the majority of the 275 kV lines could be uprated to 400 kV, and secondly it was envisaged that operation at 400 kV could begin in 1965 compared with 1968 for a 500 kV scheme. Design work was started and in order to meet the programme for 1965 it was necessary for the contract engineering for the first projects to run concurrently with the design. One of these projects was the West Burton 400 kV Indoor Substation, the first section of which was commissioned in June 1965. From 1965, the grid was partly upgraded to 400 kV, beginning with a  line from Sundon to West Burton, to become the Supergrid.

In the 2010 issue of the code that governs the National Grid, the Grid Code, the Supergrid is defined as those parts of the British electricity transmission system that are connected at voltages in excess of 200 kV.

The 2.2 GW undersea Western HVDC Link from Scotland to North Wales was built in 2013–2018. This was the first major non-alternating current grid link within Great Britain, although interconnectors to foreign grids already used HVDC.

In 2021 a new non-lattice design of electricity pylon, the T-pylon, was built near East Huntspill, Somerset for the new 35 mile Hinkley Point C to Avonmouth connection.

Characteristics of the grid

The contiguous synchronous grid covers England (including the Isle of Wight), Scotland (including some of the Scottish islands such as Orkney, Skye and the Western Isles which have limited connectivity), Wales, and the Isle of Man.

Network size
The following figures are taken from the 2005 Seven Year Statement.
 Maximum demand (2005/6): 63 GW (approx.) (81.39% of capacity)
 Minimum demand (2020 May): 15.3 GW
 Annual electrical energy used in the UK is around 
 Capacity (2005/6): 79.9 GW (or 80 GW per the 2008 Seven Year Statement)
 Number of large power stations connected to it: 181
 Length of 400 kV grid: 11,500 km (circuit)
 Length of 275 kV grid: 9,800 km (circuit)
 Length of 132 kV (or lower) grid; 5,250 km (circuit)

Total generating capacity is supplied roughly equally by renewable, gas fired, nuclear, coal fired power stations.

Decarbonisation 
The national grid has a stretch target to be carbon neutral or negative by 2033, well ahead of the UK's national target to achieve this by 2050. It also aims to have the capability to be 'zero carbon' as early as 2025, meaning that if energy suppliers are able to produce sufficient green power, the grid could theoretically run without any greenhouse gas emissions at all (i.e. no carbon capture or offsetting would be needed as is the case with 'net zero'). In 2020 about 40% of the grid's energy came from burning natural gas, and it is not expected  that anywhere close to sufficient green power will be available to run the grid on zero carbon in 2025, except perhaps on the very windiest days. Analysts such as Hartree Solutions considered in 2020 that getting to 'net zero' by 2050 would be challenging, even more so to reach 'net zero' by 2033. There has, however, been sustained progress towards carbon neutrality, with carbon intensity falling by 53% in the five years to 2020. The phase out of coal is progressing rapidly with only 1.6% of the UK's electricity coming from coal in 2020, compared with about 25% in 2015. 2020 saw the UK go more than two months without needing to burn any coal for electricity, the longest period since the industrial revolution.

Losses
Figures are again from the 2005 Seven Year Statement.
 Joule heating in cables: 857.8 MW
 Fixed losses: 266 MW (consists of corona and iron loss; can be 100 MW higher in adverse weather)
 Substation transformer heating losses: 142.4 MW
 Generator transformer heating losses: 157.3 MW
 Total losses: 1,423.5 MW (2.29% of peak demand)

Although overall losses in the national grid are low, there are significant further losses in onward electricity distribution to the consumer, causing a total distribution loss of about 7.7%. Losses differ significantly for customers connected at different voltages; connected at high voltage the total losses are about 2.6%, at medium voltage 6.4% and at low voltage 12.2%.

Generated power entering the grid is metered at the high-voltage side of the generator transformer. Any power losses in the generator transformer are therefore accounted to the generating company, not to the grid system. The power loss in the generator transformer does not contribute to the grid losses.

Power flow
In 2009–10 there was an average power flow of about 11 GW from the north of the UK, particularly from Scotland and northern England, to the south of the UK across the grid. This flow was anticipated to grow to about 12 GW by 2014. Completion of the Western HVDC Link in 2018 added capacity for a flow of 2.2 GW between Western Scotland and North Wales.

Because of the power loss associated with this north to south flow, the effectiveness and efficiency of new generation capacity is significantly affected by its location. For example, new generating capacity on the south coast has about 12% greater effectiveness due to reduced transmission system power losses compared to new generating capacity in north England, and about 20% greater effectiveness than in northern Scotland.

Interconnectors

There is a 40 MW AC cable to the Isle of Man, the Isle of Man to England Interconnector.

The UK grid is connected to adjacent European electrical grids by submarine power cables at an electricity interconnection level (transmission capacity relative to production capacity) which was 6% . 

As of 2022, the total capacity of these connectors is about 7.7 GW. They include direct-current cables to northern France (2 GW HVDC Cross-Channel, 1 GW HVDC IFA-2, 1 GW ElecLink via the Channel Tunnel); Belgium (1 GW HVDC Nemo Link); the Netherlands (1 GW HVDC BritNed); Norway (1.4 GW HDVC North Sea Link); Northern Ireland (500 MW HVDC Moyle Interconnector); and the Republic of Ireland (500 MW HVDC East–West Interconnector).

A link is under construction to Denmark (1.4 GW Viking Link) which is due to be completed in 2023. A further 500 MW link with the Republic of Ireland (Greenlink) is scheduled for 2024. Further potential schemes include links with Germany (NeuConnect, 1.4 GW); Iceland (Icelink, around 1 GW) and Morocco (3.6 GW from new battery-backed solar generation).

Grid storage
The UK grid has access to large pumped storage systems, notably Dinorwig Power Station which can provide 1.7 GW for 5–6 hours, and the smaller Cruachan and Ffestiniog.

There are also some grid batteries. As of May 2021, 1.3 GW of battery storage was operating in the United Kingdom, with 16 GW of projects in the pipeline potentially deployable over the next few years. A 100 MW power Chinese-financed plant at Minety, Wiltshire was reported to be the largest in Europe when it opened in July 2021; when a 50 MW extension is completed, the site's storage capacity will be 266 MWh.

Reserve services and frequency response

National Grid is responsible for contracting short term generating provision to cover demand prediction errors and sudden failures at power stations. This covers a few hours of operation giving time for market contracts to be established to cover longer term balancing.

Frequency-response reserves act to keep the system's AC frequency within ±1% of 50 Hz, except in exceptional circumstances. These are used on a second by second basis to either lower the demand or to provide extra generation.

Reserve services are a group of services each acting within different response times:
 Fast Reserve: rapid delivery (within two minutes) of increased generation or reduced demand, sustainable for a minimum of 15 minutes.
 Fast Start: generation units that start from a standstill and deliver power within five minutes automatically, or within seven minutes of a manual instruction, with generation maintained for a minimum of four hours.
 Demand Management: reduction in demand of at least 25 MW from large power users, for at least an hour.
 Short Term Operating Reserve (STOR): generation of at least 3 MW, from a single or aggregation of sites, within four hours of instruction and maintained for at least two hours.
 BM Start-Up: mainstream major generation units maintained in either an energy readiness or hot standby state.

These reserves are sized according to three factors:
 The largest credible single generation failure event, which is currently either Sizewell B nuclear power station (1,260 MW) or one cable of the HVDC Cross-Channel interconnector (1,000 MW)
 The general anticipated availability of all generation plants
 Anticipated demand prediction errors

Control of the grid
The English and Welsh parts of the National Grid are controlled from the National Grid Control Centre which is located in St Catherine's Lodge, Sindlesham, Wokingham in Berkshire. It is sometimes described as being a 'secret' location.  the system is under consistent cyber attack.

Although the transmission network in Scotland is owned by separate companies – SP Transmission plc (part of Scottish Power) in the south, and Scottish Hydro Electric Transmission plc (part of Scottish and Southern Electricity Networks) in the north – overall control rests with National Grid Electricity System Operator.

Transmission costs

The costs of operating the National Grid System are recouped by National Grid Electricity System Operator (NGESO) through levying of Transmission Network Use of System (TNUoS) charges on the users of the system. The costs are split between the generators and the users of electricity.

Tariffs are set annually by NGESO, and the country is divided into zones, each with a different tariff for generation and consumption. In general, tariffs are higher for generators in the north and consumers in the south since there is generally a north–south flow of electricity.

Triad demand
'Triad demand' is a metric of demand which reports retrospectively three numbers about peak demand between November and February (inclusive) each winter.  In order to encourage usage of the National Grid to be less 'peaky', the triad is used as the basis for extra charges paid by the users (the licensed electricity suppliers) to the National Grid: the users pay less if they can manage their usage so as to be less peaky.

For each year's calculation, historic system demand metrics are analysed to determine three half-hour periods of high average demand; the three periods are known as triads. The periods are (a) the period of peak system demand, and (b) two other periods of highest demand which are separated from peak system demand and from each other by at least ten days.

For power stations, the chargeable demand is only the net site demand (per CUSC rule 14.17.10), so when the site is net exporting (i.e. total metered generation at that site exceeds total separately-metered station demand), that separately-metered station demand shall not be liable for demand TNUoS charges in relation to the station demand at triad.

Triad dates in recent years were:

In April of each year, each licensed electricity supplier (such as Centrica, BGB, etc.) is charged a yearly fee for the load it imposed on the grid during those three half-hours of the previous winter. Exact charges vary depending on the distance from the centre of the network, but in the South West it is £21,000/MW. The average for the whole country is about £15,000/MW. This is a means for National Grid to recover some of its costs, and to impose an incentive on users to minimise consumption at peak, thereby easing the need for investment in the system. It is estimated that these charges reduced peak load by about 1 GW out of say 57 GW.

This is the main source of income which National Grid uses to cover its costs for high-voltage long-distance transmission (lower voltage distribution is charged separately). The grid also charges an annual fee to cover the cost of generators, distribution networks and large industrial users connecting.

Triad charges encourage users to cut load at peak periods; this is often achieved by using diesel generators. Such generators are also routinely used by National Grid.

Estimating costs per kW⋅h of transmission
If the total TNUoS or Triad receipts (say £15,000/MW·year × 50,000 MW = £750 million/year) is divided by the total number of units delivered by the UK generating system in a year (the total number of units sold – say .), then a crude estimate can be made of transmission costs, and one gets the figure of around 0.2p/kW⋅h. Other estimates also give a figure of 0.2p/kW⋅h.

However, Bernard Quigg notes: "According to the 06/07 annual accounts for NGC UK transmission, NGC carried 350TW⋅h for an income of £2012m in 2007, i. e. NGC receives 0.66p per kW hour. With two years inflation to 2008/9, say 0.71p per kW⋅h.", but this also includes generators' connection fees.

Generation charges
In order to be allowed to supply electricity to the transmission system, generators must be licensed (by BEIS) and enter into a connection agreement with NGET which also grants Transmission Entry Capacity (TEC). Generators contribute to the costs of running the system by paying for TEC, at the generation TNUoS tariffs set by NGET. This is charged on a maximum-capacity basis. In other words, a generator with 100 MW of TEC who only generated at a maximum rate of 75 MW during the year would still be charged for the full 100 MW of TEC.

In some cases, there are negative TNUoS tariffs. These generators are paid an amount based on their peak net supply over three proving runs over the course of the year. This represents the reduction in costs caused by having a generator close to the centre of demand of the country.

National Grid uses a grid services market. "Dynamic Containment" started in October 2020, initially priced at £17 per MW per hour, and Dynamic Regulation (DR) started in April 2022.

Demand charges

Consumers of electricity are split into two categories: half-hourly metered (HH) and non-half-hourly metered (NHH). Customers whose peak demand is sufficiently high are obliged to have a HH meter, which, in effect, takes a meter reading every 30 minutes. The rates at which charges are levied on these customers' electricity suppliers therefore varies 17,520 times a (non-leap) year.

The TNUoS charges for a HH metered customer are based on their demand during three half-hour periods of greatest demand between November and February, known as the Triad. Due to the nature of electricity demand in the UK, the three Triad periods always fall in the early evening, and must be separated by at least ten clear working days. The TNUoS charges for a HH customer are simply their average demand during the triad periods multiplied by the tariff for their zone. Therefore, a customer in London with a 1 MW average demand during the three triad periods would pay £19,430 in TNUoS charges.

TNUoS charges levied on NHH metered customers are much simpler. A supplier is charged for the sum of their total consumption between 16:00 and 19:00 every day over a year, multiplied by the relevant tariff.

Constraint payments
Constraint payments are payments to generators above a certain size, where the National Grid gives them dispatch instructions that they are unable to take the electricity that the generators would normally provide. This can be due to a lack of transmission capacity, a shortfall in demand, or unexpected excess generation. A constraint payment is recompense for the reduction in generation.

Major incidents
Power cuts due to faults in the national grid, or lack of generation to supply it with sufficient power, are very rare. The overall performance of the system is published on National Grid's website and includes a simple high-level figure for the transmission system availability.  this was 99.999612%.

In 2020–21, issues affecting the low voltage distribution networks – for which National Grid is not responsible – caused almost all the 60 minutes or so per year, on average, of unplanned domestic power cuts.

Since 1990, there have been a small number of prominent power outages which were linked to National Grid:

August 2003

In the early evening of 28 August 2003, a power cut affected 476,000 customers in the south London area, as well as the London Underground and some rail services, for approximately 40 minutes. A total of 724 MW of load was lost.

An oil leak had been left untreated, except for top-ups, for many months, pending a proper fix. This caused an alarm which was misinterpreted by the National Grid control room. While switching the presumed faulty equipment out, an incorrectly-sized protection relay installed several years prior caused a circuit breaker to trip, resulting in the loss of supply to two major south London substations.

September 2003

A week after the London blackout, on 5 September 2003, an incident occurred at Hams Hall substation which affected supply to 201,000 customers  in east Birmingham. Affected customers included Network Rail, Birmingham International Airport, and the National Exhibition Centre, with a total of 301 MW  of load lost.

This was attributed to an error made by National Grid when commissioning protection systems after upgrading components in the substation that August.

May 2008

On 27 May 2008 starting at 11:34, two of Britain's largest power stations, Longannet in Fife and Sizewell B in Suffolk, disconnected from the grid ("tripped") within minutes of each other. The total combined loss of generation caused by these trips was at least 1714 MW — larger than the maximum loss of 1260 MW which the grid was required to support that day.

The system frequency immediately dropped to 49.2 Hz, and subsequent additional trips of generation due to automatic protection caused the frequency to fall further to a low of 48.8 Hz. This caused the distribution networks to automatically disconnect some customers in order to arrest the frequency drop, and over the next few hours National Grid ordered the distribution networks to reduce voltage in order to reduce demand. At least 500,000 customers lost power. Within 40 minutes, distribution networks were allowed to reconnect all customers, although voltage control continued in some areas until 18:07.

The incident was described as a "gigantic coincidence" and was not attributed to lack of investment. Nonetheless, a number of issues were exposed by the event. The behaviour of generation protection during sudden frequency changes caused a number of generators to disconnect from the grid incorrectly. The Low Frequency Demand Disconnection and voltage control schemes also did not deliver as much demand reduction as they were intended to, but this did not have a significant impact on the outage.

August 2019
The third event occurred on 9 August 2019, when around a million customers across Great Britain found themselves without power. Lightning struck a transmission line at 4:52 pm, causing the loss of 500 MW embedded (mostly solar) generation. Almost immediately, Little Barford Power Station and Hornsea Wind Farm tripped within seconds of each other, removing 1.378 GW of generation, which was in excess of the 1 GW of backup power (the size of the largest single expected loss) that the operator was maintaining at the time. The grid frequency fell to 48.8 Hz before automatic load-shedding disconnected 5% of the local distribution networks (1.1 million customers) for 15 to 20 minutes; this action stabilised the remaining 95% of the system and prevented a wider blackout.

Although power was maintained at all times to the railway network (but not to the signalling system), the reduction in frequency caused 60 Thameslink Class 700 and 717 trains to fail. Half were restarted by the drivers but the others required a technician to come out to the train to restart it. This led to substantial travel disruption for several hours on the East Coast Main Line and Thameslink services. The supply to Newcastle Airport was also disrupted, and a weakness was exposed in backup power arrangements at Ipswich Hospital.

An investigation by Ofgem concluded in January 2020. It found that Little Barford and Hornsea One had failed to remain connected to the grid following the lightning strike, and their operators – RWE and Ørsted respectively – agreed to each pay £4.5 million to Ofgem's redress fund. Additionally, Ofgem fined distribution network operator UK Power Networks £1.5M for beginning to reconnect customers before being cleared to do so, although this breach of procedure did not affect the recovery of the system.

Minor incidents

November 2015
On 4 November 2015 National Grid issued an emergency notice asking for voluntary power cuts because of "multiple plant breakdowns". No power cuts occurred but wholesale electricity prices rose dramatically, with the grid paying up to £2,500 per megawatt-hour.

See also

 Demand response
 Cost of electricity by source
 Economics of nuclear power plants – for cost comparisons
 Energy security and renewable technology
 Intermittent energy source
 TV pickup
 2007 switching station flood at Walham, Gloucestershire
 List of energy storage projects
 List of major power outages
 Spark spread – calculating the cost of back-up
 Load management
 Three-phase electric power
 List of HVDC projects
 List of high voltage underground and submarine cables
 National Grid Reserve Service
 Energy in the United Kingdom
 High-voltage substations in the United Kingdom

References

Further reading

External links

 The Transmission System, National Grid's Seven Year Statement (2008)
 The Statement of the Use of System Charging Methodology , National Grid
 Useful Information, National Grid
 National Grid live data, ELEXON
 UK National Grid Status
 UK Electricity Networks: The nature of UK electricity transmission and distribution networks in an intermittent renewable and embedded electricity generation future, Scott Butler
 The electricity supply industry and the Central Electricity Generating Board, UK Competition Commission Report 1987
 Map of GB power stations and national grid, BBC website, but map revised by Deloitte & Touche, 2003. Archive
 Carbon-intensity variations in the GB grid

 
Electric power transmission in the United Kingdom
1933 establishments in the United Kingdom
Wide area synchronous grids